The Subdistricts of Afghanistan are the third-level administrative units of Afghanistan, subdivisions of the districts. They are known as "Alaqadari" and are the smallest administrative divisions. Each alaqadari is headed by an "alaqadar", appointed by the government in Kabul or a provincial governor.

List

Wardak Province

Jalrez District
The divisions are also referred to as hawzaha-ye edari:
 
Jalrez
Zaiwalat
Sanglakh
Takana
Sarchashma

References

 
Afghanistan
Subdivisions of Afghanistan